The manga series Chihayafuru is written and illustrated by Yuki Suetsugu. The series has been serialized in Kodansha's Be Love magazine from 28 December 2007 to 1 August 2022. It is about a school girl, Chihaya Ayase, who is inspired by a new classmate to take up Hyakunin Isshu karuta competitively. The chapters were collected into 50 tankōbon volumes. Kodansha also published the first three volumes in a two-volume bilingual edition, with English translations by Stuart Varnam Atkin and Yōko Toyozaki.

On 14 February 2017, Kodansha Comics began publishing a digital edition of the series in English; 33 volumes have been released as of August 2022. The manga is licensed in French by Pika Édition, in Korean by Haksan Culture Company, in traditional Chinese by Tong Li Publishing, and in Thai by Bongkoch Publishing.


Volume list

References

External links
Chihayafuru at Kodansha Comics

Chihayafuru